Bae Suzy (born October 10, 1994), better known by the mononym Suzy, is a South Korean singer and actress. She was a member of the girl group miss A under JYP Entertainment.

Film

Television series

Web series

Television shows

Hosting

Music videos

References

External links
 

South Korean filmographies